Eric Berry (born 1988) is an American former football player.

Eric Berry may also refer to:

Eric Berry (actor) (1913–1993), British actor
Erick Berry (1892–1974), American author and illustrator

See also
Eric Barry (1927–2015), Canadian Army officer